The 10th Annual Gotham Independent Film Awards, presented by the Independent Filmmaker Project, were held on September 20, 2000 and were hosted by Jason Alexander. At the ceremony, Robert Altman, Michael Barker, Tom Bernard and Marcie Bloom were honored with Career Tributes and Aiyana Elliott received the Anthony Radziwell Documentary Achievement Award.

Winners and nominees

Breakthrough Actor
 Michelle Rodriguez – Girlfight

Breakthrough Director (Open Palm Award)
 Karyn Kusama – Girlfight
 Bruno de Almeida – On the Run
 Myles Connell – The Opportunists
 Tom Gilroy – Spring Forward
 Kenneth Lonergan – You Can Count on Me

Anthony Radziwell Documentary Achievement Award
 Aiyana Elliott for The Ballad of Ramblin' Jack

Classical Film Tribute
 Do the Right Thing

Career Tributes
 Robert Altman
 Michael Barker, Tom Bernard and Marcie Bloom

References

External links
 

2000
2000 film awards